Omar Bashir is an Iraqi-Hungarian musician. His father, Munir Bashir, was considered to be the supreme master of the Arab maqamat scale system.

Omar Bashir was born in Budapest in 1970, and started playing the oud with his father at the age of five. He joined the Baghdad Music and Ballet School and eventually created his own band, which toured in many countries.
In 1991, he left for Budapest and joined the Franz Liszt Academy.

Omar performed as a soloist and with his father Munir until his death in 1997. During his career, he toured many countries and released more than 19 albums. His music is a mix of traditional Arabic music with a jazz-like improvisation.

Musical works and performances

Albums
Omar Bashir released a total of 23 CDs. His album Crazy Oud was released in 2010 by the record company EMI. The sales of this CD has topped the charts in several Arab countries. Below is a listing of all of the albums he has released, in chronological order:

 Music from Iraq - 1992
 Duet of the Two Bashirs: Munir and Omar - 1994, dubbed by French papers at the time to be the "best musical performance."
 From the Euphrates to the Danube - 1997, a mix of oud and Western music. The title of this CD refers to the two rivers generally near where he grew up and where he was born, respectively.
 Ashwaq - 1998, a solo oud performance
 My Memories - 1998, included the oud and percussion instruments
 Flamenco Night - 1998, a recording of the last concert that Omar played with his father, before the latter's death
 Al Andalus - 1999, the first-ever combination of oud and guitar, produced by Shahin Production in Lebanon
 Zikrayati - 1999. The song, whose title means "my memories," was played using oud and percussion.
 Live Solo Oud Performance - 2000, played in Beirut, Lebanon
Maqam - 2000
 Sound of Civilizations - 2001, Buddha Bar style of music
 To My Father - 2002, used oud and percussion to play and improvise pieces performed together with his father
 ..Bghdadiyat with Shara Taha 2002
 Gypsy Oud - 2003, a combination of oud and Hungarian Gypsy music
 Latin Oud - 2004, the first time that Latin tunes were played on the oud
 Oud Hawl al Alam ("Oud Around the World") - 2004, played first at a live concert in Budapest, this was the first time that music from the oud and guitar were combined
 Crazy Oud - 2010, involves various styles of music, such as Iraqi maqam, rumba, flamenco, blues, ambient, classical, folklore, and improvisation
    The Platinum Collection . EMI 2011
 Masters of Oud - 2010, duets performed by Munir and Omar Bashir and released by EMI, which created the CD remixes "Baghdad Blues - Desert Launch", "Mesopotamix" and "Café du Paris".
 Takasim - 2012, a solo oud recording produced by INEDIT Records
 The Legend Live Concert - 2015 Universal Company

Concerts and tours

Arab countries and America
Lebanon: Almadina Theatre - Beirut, Alhariri Theatre - Sajda – Lebanon 
Egypt: The Opera House in Cairo and Alexanderia 
Syria: City Theatre, Mar Elyan Church & The International Festival. 
Jordan: The Royal Theatre & Jeresh Festival 
Tunis: Al Mashtal Theatre, Ken Festival 
Morocco: Fes, Rabat, Casablanca, Marakesh, Tatwan and Aghadir.  Oud Duo tour concert: Munir Bashir & Omar as well as solo Oud performances in Mawazin Festival and Oud International Festival.
Algeria: National Theatre 
Palestine: Ramallah Popular art centre 
UAE: Dubai and Abu Dhabi: Islamic Music Festival and WOMED Festival. 
Bahrain: 5th Spring Cultural Festival. 
USA: touredextensivelythroughvarious US states: New York, Washington- Durham, Arcansas, Denver and variousothersatesperforming at variousprestigiousvenueswhich included Cambridge Academy, Lincoln Jazz Theatre, Symphony Space, The Duke University, World Culture Museum, Kennedy Centre. 
Canada-Montreal: Arab Music Festival ..2008..2015

United States
Omar Bashir has traveled through various states, including New York, Washington, Arkansas, Colorado, and others, performing at venues including the Cambridge Academy, Lincoln Jazz Theater, Symphony Space, Duke University, the World Culture Museum, and the Kennedy Center.

References

1970 births
Living people
Iraqi musicians
People from Mosul
Musicians from Budapest
Iraqi oud players
Hungarian people of Iraqi descent
Hungarian people of Assyrian descent
Iraqi people of Hungarian descent